Great ape personhood is a movement to extend personhood and some legal protections to the non-human members of the great ape family: chimpanzees, gorillas, and orangutans.

Advocates include primatologists Jane Goodall and Dawn Prince-Hughes, evolutionary biologist Richard Dawkins, philosophers Paola Cavalieri and Peter Singer, and legal scholar Steven Wise.

Status

On February 28, 2007, the parliament of the Balearic Islands, an autonomous community of Spain, passed the world's first legislation that would effectively grant legal personhood rights to all great apes. The act sent ripples across Spain, producing public support for the rights of great apes. On June 25, 2008 a parliamentary committee set forth resolutions urging Spain to grant the primates the right to life and liberty. If approved "it will ban harmful experiments on apes and make keeping them for circuses, television commercials, or filming illegal under Spain's penal code."

These precedents followed years of European legal efforts. In 1992, Switzerland amended its constitution to recognize animals as beings and not things. However, in 1999 the Swiss constitution was completely rewritten. A decade later, Germany guaranteed rights to animals in a 2002 constitutional amendment, the first European Union member to do so.

New Zealand created specific legal protections for five great ape species in 1999. The use of gorillas, chimpanzees and orangutans in research, testing or teaching is limited to activities intended to benefit these animals or its species. A New Zealand animal protection group later argued the restrictions conferred weak legal rights.

Several European countries (including Austria, the Netherlands and Sweden) have completely banned the use of great apes in animal testing. Austria was the first country to ban experimentation on lesser apes. Under EU Directive 2010/63/EU, the entire European Union banned great ape experimentation in 2013.

Argentina granted a captive orangutan basic rights in late 2014.

On April 20, 2015, Justice Barbara Jaffe of New York State Supreme Court ordered a writ of habeas corpus to two captive chimpanzees but the next day the ruling was amended to strike the words "writ of habeas corpus".

Advocacy
Well-known advocates include primatologist Jane Goodall, who was appointed a goodwill ambassador for the United Nations to fight the bushmeat trade and end ape extinction; Richard Dawkins, former Professor for the Public Understanding of Science at Oxford University; Peter Singer, professor of philosophy at Princeton University; and attorney and former Harvard professor Steven Wise, founder and president of the Nonhuman Rights Project (NhRP), whose aim is to use U.S. common law on a state-by-state basis to achieve recognition of legal personhood for great apes and other self-aware, autonomous non-human animals. All advocate for great ape personhood.

In December 2013, the NhRP filed three lawsuits on behalf of four chimpanzees being held in captivity in New York State, arguing that they should be recognized as legal persons with the fundamental right to bodily liberty (i.e. not to be held in captivity) and that they are entitled to common law writs of habeas corpus and should be immediately freed and moved to sanctuaries. All three petitions for writs of habeas corpus were denied, allowing for the right to appeal. The NhRP is in the process of appealing all three decisions.

Goodall's longitudinal studies revealed the social and family life of chimps to be similar to those of human beings. She herself calls them individuals, and says they relate to her as an individual member of the clan. Laboratory studies of ape language ability began to reveal other human traits, as did genetics, and eventually three of the great apes were reclassified as hominids.

Other studies, such as one done by Beran & Evans, indicate other qualities that humans share with non-human primates, namely the ability to self-control. In order for chimpanzees to control their impulsivity, they use self-distraction techniques similar to those that are used by children. Great apes also exhibited ability to plan as well as project "oneself into the future", known as the process of mental time travel. Such complicated tasks require self-awareness, which great apes appear to possess: "the capacity that contribute to the ability to delay gratification, since a self-aware individual may be able to imagine future states of the self".

This, alongside the increasing risk of great ape extinction, had led the animal rights movement to put pressure on nations to recognize apes as having limited rights and being legal "persons." In response, the United Kingdom introduced a ban on research using great apes, although testing on other primates has not been limited.

Writer and lecturer Thomas Rose argues that granting legal rights to non-humans is nothing new. He points out that in most of the world, "corporations are recognized as legal persons and are granted many of the same rights humans enjoy, the right to sue, to vote and to freedom of speech." Dawn Prince-Hughes has written that great apes meet the commonly accepted standards for personhood: "self-awareness; comprehension of past, present, and future; the ability to understand complex rules and their consequences on emotional levels; the ability to choose to risk those consequences, a capacity for empathy, and the ability to think abstractly."

Gary Francione questions the concept of granting personhood on the basis of whether the animal is human-like (as some have argued) and believes sentience should be the sole criteria used to determine if an animal should enjoy basic rights. Several other animals, including mice and rats, should also be granted such rights, he asserts.

Interpretation
Depending on the exact wording of any proposed or adopted declaration, personhood for the Great Apes raises questions concerning protections and obligations under national and international laws including:
 Articles 7–29 of the Universal Declaration of Human Rights
 The 1954 Convention Relating to the Status of Stateless Persons and 1961 Convention on the Reduction of Statelessness regarding nationality and citizenship for persons
 Provisions 4 and 5 of the Declaration of the Rights of the Child

See also

 Animal testing on non-human primates
 Biolinguistics
 Emotion in animals
 Great Ape Project
 International Primate Day
 International trade in primates
 List of notable apes
 Primate cognition
 Speciesism
 The Mentality of Apes
 The Mind of an Ape
 Theory of mind

References

Animal rights
Apes
Personhood
Primatology
Legal entities